Robert Thorne or Thorn may refer to:
Robert Thorne (cartographer) (1492-1532), English cartographer
Robert Thorne (typographer) (1754–1820), English typefounder
Robert Thorne (cricketer) (1860–1930), English cricketer
Robert J. Thorne (1875–1955), American businessman
Robert C. Thorne (1898–1960), American paleontologist
Robert Folger Thorne (1920–2015), American botanist
Robert Thorn, a fictional character and the protagonist of the 1976 horror film The Omen
Robert Thorn (MP), Member of Parliament (MP) for Bristol
Robert Thorne (racing driver), a member of the automobile racing team K-Pax Racing